Wayne Clarke is a radio presenter, producer and author. He is the current holder of the Andrew Cross Award as "Religious Broadcaster of the Year (local and regional)". Clarke is also an ordained Baptist minister. He was minister at New North Road Baptist Church, Huddersfield from 2012 to 2018. He was minister at Dovedale Baptist Church, Liverpool from 1994 to 2012. He moved to Manchester in early 2018 to become Minister of Trinity Baptist Church, Gorton.

Clarke was born in Rugby, Warwickshire and attended Lawrence Sheriff School, Keele University and Regent's Park College, Oxford.

From March 2001 to March 2012 Wayne Clarke produced and presented "Daybreak", the religious affairs programme on BBC Radio Merseyside. On 1 January 2008 Clarke was listed by the Liverpool Echo as one of the 366 "Scouserati", the most influential people in Merseyside.

He is the author of A Ready Man, a biography of Hugh Stowell Brown, published by Instant Apostle in 2019.

References

External links
BBC Radio Merseyside page on Wayne Clarke
 Website of New North Road Baptist Church
 His personal website

1961 births
Living people
People from Rugby, Warwickshire
British radio presenters
BBC people
English Baptist ministers
Alumni of Regent's Park College, Oxford
Alumni of Keele University
People educated at Lawrence Sheriff School